Utsab is a 2000 Bengali-language drama film directed by Rituparno Ghosh and stars Madhabi Mukherjee, Mamata Shankar, Rituparna Sengupta, Prasenjit Chatterjee, Pradip Mukherjee, Deepankar De and Arpita Pal. The film focuses on the various emotional currents passing among family and relatives underneath the supposedly festive occasion of Durga Puja.

Plot
This is a family drama which is portrayed on a background of Durgapuja, West Bengal's biggest "Utshob" (Festival). The story is about a cultured Bengali family, different members of which have gathered in native house on the occasion of Durga puja. Bhagbati (Madhabi Mukherjee) has four children; two sons Asit (Pradip Mukherjee), Nishit (Bodhisattva Mazumdar) and two daughters, Parul (Mamata Shankar) and Keya (Rituparna Sengupta). It is the festival time and all the children are at the main house to celebrate the festival. Meanwhile, Shishir, (Deepankar De) a relative who is also a big real estate agent, is interested in buying the house. Most of the family members want to sell the house. The old and traditional house is not a place for everyone's interest and they have individual problems to solve with money. None of the sisters are looking forward to the family reunion as they all are more concerned about their own problems.

Cast
 Madhabi Mukherjee as Bhagabati 
 Mamata Shankar as Parul 
 Rituparna Sengupta as Keya 
 Prosenjit Chatterjee as Arun
 Arpita Pal as Shompa
 Pradip Mukherjee as Asit
 Bodhisattva Mazumdar as Nishit
 Alokananda Roy as the wife of Asit
 Anuradha Roy (actress) as the wife of Nishit
 Ratul Shankar as Joy,the son of Parul.

Awards
National Film Awards (India)
 Won - Golden Lotus Award - Best Director - Rituparno Ghosh

References

Notes

External links

2000 films
Bengali-language Indian films
Films whose director won the Best Director National Film Award
Films directed by Rituparno Ghosh
2000s Bengali-language films